Mikel Alonso Flores (born 23 September 1996) is a Spanish cyclist, who currently rides for UCI ProTeam .

Major results
2019
 7th Circuito de Getxo
2021
 7th Clàssica Comunitat Valenciana 1969

References

External links

1996 births
Living people
Cyclists from the Basque Country (autonomous community)
Sportspeople from Gipuzkoa
People from Donostialdea